The 2019–20 Algerian Women's Championship was the 22nd season of the Algerian Women's Championship, the Algerian national women's association football competition.
On March 15, 2020, the Ligue de Football Féminin (LFF) decided to halt the season due to the COVID-19 pandemic in Algeria and declared that season is over and JF Khroub to be the champion. JF Khroub won the competition for the first time.

Clubs

Standings

Play-off stage

References

Algerian Women's Championship seasons